The Ten Rings may refer to:

 Ten Rings (organization), a fictional organization in the Marvel Cinematic Universe
 Ten Rings (object), a fictional weapon in the Marvel Cinematic Universe
 Mandarin's rings, the Rings' counterpart in the Marvel Comics

See also 
 Shang-Chi and the Legend of the Ten Rings, a 2021 film set in the Marvel Cinematic Universe

Shang-Chi